The COMCO Cash Spiel is a bonspiel that is part of the men's and women's Ontario Curling Tour. The event is an annual event held in November and takes place at the Stroud Curling Club in Stroud, Ontario. The bonspiel is open to both men's and women's teams.

Past Champions

External links
2012 Event Site

References

Ontario Curling Tour events
Sport in Simcoe County